Ducks Ahoy! is an action game for the Atari 8-bit family of computers and Commodore 64 released in 1984 by CBS Software. The player maneuvers a boat around a flooded city to pick up ducks and ferry them to safety before they drown. The player must also avoid a hippopotamus, who randomly appears to try to destroy the player's boat.

References

External links
Ducks Ahoy! at Atari Mania

1984 video games
Action video games
Atari 8-bit family games
CBS Software games
Commodore 64 games
Naval video games
Single-player video games
Video games about birds
Video games developed in the United States